5,6-Dibromo-DMT (5,6-Dibromo-N,N-dimethyltryptamine, 5,6-Br-DMT) is a substituted tryptamine alkaloid found in some marine sponges. It is briefly mentioned in Alexander Shulgin's book TiHKAL (Tryptamines I Have Known and Loved) under the DMT entry and is stated to be found, along with other tryptamines, in Smenospongia aurea and other sponges.

See also 
5,6-Dibromo-N-methyltryptamine
6-Bromotryptamine
5-Bromo-DMT

References 

Tryptamine alkaloids
Bromoarenes
Dimethylamino compounds